Thiago Mendes Larghi (born 27 September 1980) is a Brazilian football manager. He is currently an assistant coach for Corinthians.

Career
Born in Paraíba do Sul, Rio de Janeiro, Larghi began his professional career at Botafogo in 2011, as a performance analyst. In January 2013, he was called up by technical director Carlos Alberto Parreira to join Luiz Felipe Scolari's staff in the Brazil national team.

After the 2014 FIFA World Cup, Larghi left the Seleção and spent some time in Europe. In 2016, he returned to Brazil and joined Oswaldo de Oliveira's staff at Sport.

Larghi remained as Oswaldo's assistant at Corinthians and Atlético Mineiro. On 9 February 2018, after Oswaldo's dismissal from the latter, Larghi was the only staff member kept at Galo; he was subsequently named interim manager.

On 25 June 2018, Larghi was appointed as permanent manager after over four months and 32 matches in charge, a record tenure for an interim manager in Brazil. On 17 October, however, he was sacked and replaced by Levir Culpi.

On 21 August 2020, after more than a year without a club, Larghi was named manager of Goiás in the first division, but was sacked after only 38 days in charge.

Managerial statistics

References

External links
 
 

1980 births
Living people
People from Paraíba do Sul
Brazilian football managers
Campeonato Brasileiro Série A managers
Clube Atlético Mineiro managers
Goiás Esporte Clube managers
Sportspeople from Rio de Janeiro (state)